Edward House may refer to:

 Edward House, Karachi, Pakistan
 Edward Howard House (1836–1901), American journalist
 Edward M. House (1858–1938), American diplomat
 Edward House (Australian politician) (1916–1971), member of the Western Australian Legislative Council

See also
 Edwards House (disambiguation)

House, Edward